Cousin Cousine is a 1975 French romantic comedy film directed by Jean-Charles Tacchella and starring Marie-Christine Barrault, Victor Lanoux, and Marie-France Pisier. Written by Tacchella and Danièle Thompson, the film is about two cousins by marriage who meet at a wedding and develop a close friendship. After their spouses prove unfaithful, the cousins' friendship leads to a passionate love affair. Cousin Cousine received an Academy Award nomination for Best Foreign Language Film, a César Award nomination for Best Film, a Golden Globe nomination for Best Foreign Film, and the U.S. National Board of Review Award as one of the Top 5 Foreign Films of the Year. In 1989, an English-language remake was released, Cousins.

Plot
Two cousins related by marriage, Marthe and Ludovic, meet at a family wedding for the first time. Marthe is the bride's daughter and Ludovic is the groom's nephew. After a raucous wedding reception with plenty of dancing and drinking, Marthe and Ludovic are left waiting for their respective spouses, Pascal and Karine, who are off having sex. While they wait, they get to know each other: Marthe is a secretary and Ludovic is a dance instructor who changes his occupation every three years. Later, they dance together. Eventually, Pascal and Karine show up, slightly disheveled, and the couples part.

Ludovic meets Marthe for lunch and tells her that her husband is having an affair with his wife. Later, Pascal informs her that he's broken off all of his affairs and that, from now on, she will be the only one. When Marthe tells him she knows about Karine, he says he only had her "three times in the bushes".

Sometime later at a family gathering at Marthe's mother's house, Ludovic's daughter, Nelsa, shows slides she took at the wedding—including compromising photos of Pascal and Karine. During the slide show, Martha's mother's new husband dies. At the funeral, Ludovic's father arrives and extends his condolences; he too lost his spouse recently. On the way back from the cemetery, Marthe and Ludovic get better acquainted, with Marthe revealing that she enjoys swimming and singing.

Later that week, Marthe and Ludovic meet for lunch, buy bathing suits, and go swimming in a public pool. They enjoy each other's company so much that they decide to take the rest of the day off together to go shopping and see a movie. Although their relationship is platonic, Pascal and Karine begin to grow jealous. Marthe and Ludovic playfully arrange to meet by chance at a restaurant with their respective families, to see how Pascal and Karine react. Later that week, Marthe and Ludovic meet again at the swimming pool and acknowledge that their relationship is special and must remain that way, even if platonic.

At another family wedding, with Pascal and the groom's father fighting over a business deal gone wrong, Marthe and Ludovic decide to leave and spend the day together. They return to find a drunken Pascal harassing the guests, and soon they all leave the disastrous wedding and bring Pascal home. Marthe's mother and Ludovic's father develop a close friendship and plan to spend time at his vineyard. Marthe and Ludovic discuss their own relationship and decide that it is absurd to keep it platonic. For once, they will do something for themselves, and not for their spouses and families.

That Saturday, Marthe and Ludovic meet and spend the day together making love. The following morning, they extend their stay another day, making love, exchanging recipes, and bathing together.

In the coming days, Pascal reverts to his philandering ways, Karine leaves Ludovic and then returns, and Marthe's mother and Ludovic's father discover they're not as compatible as they thought. Marthe and Ludovic's relationship, however, continues to grow in love. At a Christmas family gathering at Marthe's mother's house, Marthe and Ludovic lock themselves in a bedroom and make love throughout the evening while their families eat, drink, watch Midnight Mass, and exchange gifts. The couple finally emerge from the bedroom, say goodbye to their crazy families, and ride off into the night together.

Cast
 Marie-Christine Barrault as Marthe
 Victor Lanoux as Ludovic
 Marie-France Pisier as Karine
 Guy Marchand as Pascal
 Ginette Garcin as Biju
 Sybil Maas as Diane
 Popeck as Sacy
 Pierre Plessis as Gobert
 Catherine Verlor as Nelsa
 Hubert Gignoux as Thomas
 Catherine Stermann as Monique

Reception
Upon its theatrical release, Cousin Cousine received mostly positive reviews, both in Europe and the United States, where it became a surprise hit – the most popular French film in the US since A Man and a Woman.

The film was the 35th highest-grossing film of the year in France with 1,161,394 cinema admissions.

In his review in the Chicago Sun-Times, Roger Ebert gave the film three and a half stars out of four, writing:

In his review in The New York Times, Vincent Canby called the film "an exceptionally winning, wittily detailed comedy that is as much about family relationships as it is about love." Canby goes on to write:

Awards and nominations

 1975 Louis Delluc Prize (Jean-Charles Tacchella)	Won
 1976 César Award for Best Supporting Actress (Marie-France Pisier) Won
 1976 César Award Nomination for Best Actor (Victor Lanoux)
 1976 César Award Nomination for Best Film (Jean-Charles Tacchella)
 1976 César Award Nomination for Best Screenplay (Jean-Charles Tacchella)
 1976 San Sebastián International Film Festival Silver Seashell Award (Jean-Charles Tacchella) Won
 1976 National Board of Review Award for Top Five Foreign Films Won
 1977 Academy Award Nomination for Best Actress in a Leading Role (Marie-Christine Barrault)
 1977 Academy Award Nomination for Best Foreign Language Film
 1977 Academy Award Nomination for Best Writing (Original Screenplay) (Jean-Charles Tacchella, Danièle Thompson)
 1977 Golden Globe Award Nomination for Best Foreign Film
 1978 Kansas City Film Critics Circle Award for Best Foreign Film Won

See also
 List of submissions to the 49th Academy Awards for Best Foreign Language Film
 List of French submissions for the Academy Award for Best Foreign Language Film

References

External links
 
 

1975 films
1975 romantic comedy films
Films about adultery in France
Films about dysfunctional families
Films directed by Jean-Charles Tacchella
1970s French-language films
French romantic comedy films
Gaumont Film Company films
Louis Delluc Prize winners
1970s French films